PPCM or ppcm may refer to:

 Pixels per centimetre (typically written all in lowercase "ppcm"), a measure of pixel density
 Packed PCM, compressed PCM audio data, also known as Meridian Lossless Packing (MLP)
 Peripartum cardiomyopathy, a deterioration in cardiac function